Dziun, pseudonym of Magdalena Ferrer (born March 19, 1979 in Inowrocław) is a Polish singer and model.

She has been working as a model since she was 16, appearing on the covers of magazines all over the world. On 25 October 2011, the singer's debut album titled A.M.B.A was released 
Wife of Frank Ferrer .

Discography 

 Albums

 Songs

Filmography 

Drogi (2012, director: Małgorzata Ruszkiewicz)

References 

Polish female models
1979 births
Living people